McCord (also rendered MacCourt, McCourt, McCoard, McCard, and MacCord) is a Northern Irish and Scottish surname with origins having been found between Ayrshire, Scotland, but mostly in Airgíalla [circa 7th century AD] (modern day Irish counties of Louth, Tyrone, Armagh, and Monaghan. McCord/MacCord comes from Old Gaelic name "Mac Cuarta" or sometimes "Mac Cuairt", translating as "the son of Cuairt", a byname meaning "visitor" or "journeymen" or "son of Achilles". The town of Cappagh, County Tyrone, Northern Ireland in gaelic translates to Ceapach Mhic Cuarta meaning Mac Cuarta's tillage plot. 
It is very likely the name Mac Cuarta is a corruption of the Irish name Mac Mhuircheartaigh (septs of MacCurdy, and MacKurdy).

Notable people with the surname include:
AnnaLynne McCord (born 1987), American actress
Andrew McCord (c. 1754 – 1808), American politician
Bill McCord (1916–2004), American radio and television announcer
Bob McCord (born 1934), retired Canadian ice hockey player
Castor McCord (1907–1963), American jazz saxophonist
Catherine McCord (born 1974), American fashion model and actress
Charles McCord (born 1943), American news anchor and radio personality
Darris McCord (born 1933), former American footballer
David McCord (1897–1997), American poet
David Ross McCord (1844–1930), Canadian lawyer
Dennis McCord (born 1941), retired American professional wrestler
Dennis McCord (1952–2005), Canadian ice hockey player
Frank C. McCord (1890–1933), US Navy commander
Gary McCord (born 1948), American professional golfer
Geoffrey Sayre-McCord (born 1956), American philosopher
Harold McCord (1893–1957), American film editor
Howard McCord (born 1932), American writer
Hugo McCord (1911–2004), American biblical scholar
James W. McCord, Jr. (born 1924), electronics expert and former CIA agent
Jim Nance McCord (1878–1969), American politician
Joe McCord, Tennessee politician
Kent McCord (born 1942), American actor
Leon Clarence McCord (1878–1952), US federal judge
Louisa Susannah Cheves McCord (1810–1879), American writer
Matthew Andrew Clarke McCord ( born 1995), Irish Cricketer
Myron H. McCord (1840–1908), US Representative from Wisconsin
Quentin McCord (1978–2020), American Arena football player
Robert McCord, Treasurer of Pennsylvania
Ryan McCord (born 1989), Scottish footballer
Scott McCord, Canadian voice actor and blues singer
Seth McCord, US Non-commissioned Officer
Thomas McCord (1750–1824), Irish-born Canadian businessman and politician
Tim McCord (born 1979), American musician

References

Anglicised Irish-language surnames
Scottish surnames